The Point Skyhawks are the athletic teams that represent Point University, located in West Point, Georgia, in intercollegiate sports as a member of the National Association of Intercollegiate Athletics (NAIA), primarily competing in the Appalachian Athletic Conference (AAC) for most of its sports since the 2011–12 academic year. Its football team was a member of The Sun Conference for the 2014 and 2015 fall seasons, before moving to the Appalachian Division of the Mid-South Conference (MSC) where they competed from the 2017 to 2021 fall seasons (2017–18 to 2021–22 school years). They were also a member of the National Christian College Athletic Association (NCCAA), primarily competing as an independent in the South Region of the Division II level.

On August 9, 2022, Point was invited and unanimously approved to join the Southern States Athletic Conference (SSAC), effective July 1, 2023.

Varsity teams
Point competes in 21 intercollegiate varsity sports: Men's sports include baseball, basketball, cross country, distance track, football, golf, lacrosse, soccer, swimming, tennis; while women's sports include basketball, cross country, distance track, golf, lacrosse, soccer, softball, swimming, tennis and volleyball; and co-ed sports include cheerleading.

Achievements
The Skyhawks football team won The Sun Conference championship in 2015.

In 1993, Point (then Atlanta Christian) won the NCCAA Division II-A men's basketball championship. In 2001 Carlton Griffin was the Pete Maravich Player of the Year.

The baseball team (as Atlanta Christian) won the 2000 NCCAA Division II and the 2010 NCCAA Division II-A national championships.

References

External links